Ocurrió así (Spanish: It Happened Like So) is Spanish-language network Telemundo's first original investigative news magazine that launched on October 8, 1990 to April 26, 2002. The show was originally hosted by Enrique Gratas from 1990 until he left the network in 1999. Pedro Sevcec, a previous reporter for the show, returned as temporary host that year. The show later re-launched in 2000 with Ana Patricia Candiani hosting. Candela Ferro joined the program in 2001, and both remained until its cancellation in 2002.

Broadcast history

Ocurrió Así premiered on October 8, 1990 with Enrique Gratas as host, airing in the 5:00 p.m. timeslot. It became an instant hit, winning six Emmy Awards, and becoming the leading program for the network. Ratings, however, gradually started to slip due in part to facing competition from rival network Univision's Primer Impacto in the same timeslot. Gratas left the show in 1999, and Pedro Sevcec took over as host for the remainder of the year. When Sevcec got promoted to main anchor of Noticiero Telemundo in January 2000, Ana Patricia Candiani became the new host of Ocurrió Así, with Candela Ferro joining as co-host in 2001. These changes did not improve the show's ratings, and Ocurrió Así went off the air in 2002. The program was replaced by Al Rojo Vivo, hosted by former Primer Impacto anchor Maria Celeste Arraras.

Incidents
One of the more infamous moments in Ocurrió así was the 1993 murder of Maritza Martin, which was caught on camera. Originally, the segment was to be an interview in a graveyard where Emilio Núñez was visiting his deceased daughter. He blamed her suicide on Martin following an intense dispute on Thanksgiving of 1992. Upon facing Maritza, Núñez headed back to his car, and suddenly reappeared to fire 12 shots that killed Martin. The murder would later be used in the 2002 documentary Bowling for Columbine.

References

External links

Telemundo original programming
1990 American television series debuts
2002 American television series endings
1990s American television series
2000s American television series
Spanish-language television programming in the United States
Noticias Telemundo